Cartier Ducati Diarra (born February 6, 1998) is an American basketball player. He played college basketball for the Kansas State Wildcats and the Virginia Tech Hokies.

Early life and high school career
Diarra grew up in Harlem, New York, and broke his foot at the age of two. He was mainly raised by his mother, Danyelle Lee, alongside siblings Abraham, Cyncere and LadiRoyale, and rarely spoke to his father. Diarra grew up taking dancing lessons at Uptown Dance Academy. As a freshman, Diarra played basketball for Cardinal Hayes High School in The Bronx, New York. After one year, he transferred to West Florence High School in Florence, South Carolina, where he began living with his aunt, Lillian Shabazz. 

Diarra joined West Florence's varsity basketball team despite not having much organized basketball experience. As a sophomore, he averaged seven points and 3.7 rebounds per game. Former National Basketball Association player Sharone Wright, whose son befriended Diarra, became his mentor and father figure. As a junior, Diarra averaged 12.9 points, 7.6 rebounds, 4.8 assists and 2.2 steals per game. In his senior season, he averaged 18.8 points, 11 rebounds, 7.2 assists, 3.6 steals and 2.1 blocks per game, registering eight triple-doubles. Diarra was named The Morning News Player of the Year.

College career

Kansas State
Diarra redshirted his first season at Kansas State after suffering a torn anterior cruciate ligament, bur recovered quickly and was able to practice with the team and add strength. On November 10, 2017, he made his college debut, recording 13 points and four assists, shooting 4-of-4 from three-point range, in an 83–45 win over American. Diarra initially came of the bench but began making an immediate impact as soon as he was placed in a starting role, after Kamau Stokes broke his left foot against Texas Tech on January 6, 2018. On January 13, he scored a freshman season-high 18 points, including 16 in the second half, in a 73–72 loss to 12th-ranked Kansas. As a freshman, Diarra averaged 7.1 points, 2.5 rebounds and two assists per game. He shot 40.5 percent from three-point range, the third-most by a freshman in program history. 

Diarra missed eight games of his sophomore season with a broken finger. On March 15, 2019, at the 2019 Big 12 tournament semifinals, he scored a season-high 15 points and grabbed seven rebounds in a 63–59 loss to Iowa State. As a sophomore, Diarra averaged 6.8 points, 3.3 rebounds and 1.7 assists per game. On December 30, during his junior season, he was named Big 12 Conference Player of the Week, one day after scoring a career-high 25 points to go with seven assists and five rebounds in a 69–67 victory over Tulsa. On January 18, 2020, Diarra scored 25 points for a second time, while posting six rebounds and four assists, in an 84–68 win over West Virginia. As a junior, he averaged 13.3 points, 3.8 rebounds, 4.2 assists and 1.8 steals per game. On March 25, 2020, he announced that he would transfer from Kansas State.

Virginia Tech
On March 31, 2020, Diarra committed to play for Virginia Tech in his senior season. He was immediately eligible as a graduate transfer. In four games, Diarra averaged 7.5 points, 2.3 assists and 2.5 rebounds per game. On December 16, 2020, he announced he was opting out of the season, citing concerns over the spread of COVID-19.

Career statistics

College

|-
| style="text-align:left;"| 2016–17
| style="text-align:left;"| Kansas State
| style="text-align:center;" colspan="11"|  Redshirt
|-
| style="text-align:left;"| 2017–18
| style="text-align:left;"| Kansas State
| 37 || 22 || 23.8 || .469 || .405 || .723 || 2.5 || 2.0 || .8 || .1 || 7.1
|-
| style="text-align:left;"| 2018–19
| style="text-align:left;"| Kansas State
| 26 || 9 || 25.5 || .404 || .365 || .702 || 3.3 || 1.7 || .9 || .3 || 6.8
|-
| style="text-align:left;"| 2019–20
| style="text-align:left;"| Kansas State
| 32 || 27 || 31.3 || .412 || .305 || .669 || 3.8 || 4.2 || 1.8 || .3 || 13.3
|-
| style="text-align:left;"| 2020–21
| style="text-align:left;"| Virginia Tech
| 4 || 0 || 19.8 || .435 || .125 || .692 || 2.5 || 2.3 || .0 || .3 || 7.5
|- class="sortbottom"
| style="text-align:center;" colspan="2"| Career
| 99 || 58 || 26.5 || .427 || .339 || .692 || 3.1 || 2.6 || 1.1 || .2 || 9.0

References

External links
Virginia Tech Hokies bio
Kansas State Wildcats bio

1998 births
Living people
American men's basketball players
Basketball players from New York City
Cardinal Hayes High School alumni
People from Harlem
Kansas State Wildcats men's basketball players
Shooting guards
Sportspeople from Manhattan
Virginia Tech Hokies men's basketball players